The American Board of Ophthalmology (ABO) is an independent, non-profit organization responsible for certifying ophthalmologists (eye physicians and surgeons) in the United States of America. Founded in 1916, the ABO was the first American Board established to certify medical specialists.

The ABO is the founding member of the American Board of Medical Specialties.  Originally, a combined board of Ophthalmology & Otolaryngology, the specialties split into two board backed specialties in the 1960s.

Certification by the American Board of Ophthalmology is a voluntary process that involves a written and an oral examination. A candidate who passes both the written qualifying and oral examinations becomes a Board Certified Diplomate of the American Board of Ophthalmology.

See also
 American Board of Medical Specialties
 American Osteopathic Board of Ophthalmology and Otolaryngology

References

External links
Official website

Eye care in the United States
Medical associations based in the United States
Medical and health organizations based in Pennsylvania